Jeff Henckels (born 30 August 1984 in Luxembourg City) is an athlete from Luxembourg that competes in archery.

Henckels competed at the 2004 Summer Olympics in men's individual archery.  He was defeated in the first elimination round by Chen Szu-Yuan, placing 56th overall.  At the 2012 Summer Olympics, he was again knocked out in the first round, losing 6-2 to Rick van der Ven.

References

External links
 
 
 

1984 births
Living people
Archers at the 2004 Summer Olympics
Archers at the 2012 Summer Olympics
Olympic archers of Luxembourg
Luxembourgian male archers
Sportspeople from Luxembourg City
Archers at the 2015 European Games
European Games competitors for Luxembourg
Archers at the 2019 European Games
Archers at the 2020 Summer Olympics